Ministry of Guards was a government ministry in Iran between 1982 and 1989, which mainly acted as a ministry of defence dedicated to logistically supply the Islamic Revolutionary Guard Corps. By having its own ministry, the Corps were able to acquire a powerful voice in the cabinet of Iran. It also implied greater regulation and supervision over the Corps by placing its acquisitions and purchases under and the audit and purview of the government.

It mirrored the existing parallel Ministry of National Defence (the word "National" was dropped in 1984) which solely supported and addressed the administrative affairs of the Iranian Army (Artesh) during these years. In 1989, it was dissolved and reintegrated into the Ministry of Defence and Armed Forces Logistics (MODAFL), in order to centralize military logistics among the Iranian Armed Forces.

Ministers

References 

1982 establishments in Iran
1989 disestablishments in Iran
Ministries established in 1982
Ministries disestablished in 1989
Former government ministries of Iran
Iran
Islamic Revolutionary Guard Corps
Defunct organisations based in Iran